Sainte-Rose-du-Nord is a village on the north shore of the Saguenay River in Quebec, Canada. 

The site was known, from 1801 to 1933, as La Descente-des-Femmes. Amerindian women awaited the return of the men from fishing, and would meet them by descending from the heights to the shore. The patron saint of the parish, Rose of Lima, chosen for reasons unknown, was the first saint canonised in the New World. The specifier -du-Nord was added in 1933, when the post office was established. Residents are known as Roserains.

The parish was first established in 1838. The economy is based primarily on tourism. The village is a member of the Association of the Most Beautiful Villages of Quebec. There has been some agriculture and logging. Formerly, wood was floated from the warf to paper mills. Today, many residents work in Chicoutimi 35 km up river to the west.

The site is on the north shore of the Saguenay River. The site is in a cove with a wharf. The village is set back from the river, on hilly terrain.

It is a parish municipality in the Le Fjord-du-Saguenay Regional County Municipality within the region of Saguenay–Lac-Saint-Jean.

Demographics 

See also
Le Bonheur de Pierre: 2009 comedy-drama filmed in Sainte-Rose-du-Nord.

References

Parish municipalities in Quebec
Incorporated places in Saguenay–Lac-Saint-Jean